Peter IV may refer to:

Pope Peter IV of Alexandria (ruled 565–569)
Patriarch Peter IV of Alexandria (ruled 643–651)
Peter IV of Ravenna (927–971)
Peter IV of Bulgaria (ruled 1185–1197)
Peter IV of Aragon (1319–1387)
Peter IV of Portugal (I of Brazil) (1798–1834)
Ignatius Peter IV, Syriac Orthodox Patriarch of Antioch in 1872–1894

See also
Pedro IV (disambiguation)